My Sister may refer to:

 My Sister (film) or Sister, a 2021 Chinese film
 "My Sister" (Juliana Hatfield song), 1993
 "My Sister" (Reba McEntire song), 2005
 "My Sister", a song by Tindersticks from Tindersticks, 1995

See also